Aripo may refer to:

Trinidad and Tobago
 Aripo Cave, in the Northern Range
 Aripo Peak, part of the Aripo Massif in the Northern Range
 Aripo River, a river of Trinidad and Tobago
 Aripo Savannas, a part of the Aripo Savannas Prohibited Area and Environmentally Sensitive Area
 Heights of Aripo Village, a village in Trinidad and Tobago

Other uses
 African Regional Intellectual Property Organization (ARIPO), an intergovernmental organization

See also
 Ariporo River, a river of Colombia
 Aripov, a surname